Ucú Municipality (In the Yucatec Maya Language: “place of the seven moons”) is one of the 106 municipalities in the Mexican state of Yucatán containing  (192.89 km2) of land and located roughly 16 km northwest of the city of Mérida.

History
There is no accurate data on when the town was founded, though it existed before the conquest and in antiquity belonged to the chieftainship of Ah Canul. At colonization, Ucú became part of the encomienda system with Francisca Rodríguez Vicario recorded as the encomendero.

In 1821, Yucatán was declared independent of the Spanish Crown. In 1825 the area was part of the Mérida region, and later it passed to the region of Hunucma. Ucú was designated as its own municipality in 1925.

Governance
The municipal president is elected for a term of three years. The president appoints four Councilpersons to serve on the board for three year terms, as the Secretary and councilors who oversee public works, street lighting, nomenclature, markets, cemeteries, and commissaries.

Communities
The head of the municipality is Ucú, Yucatán. The other important town is Yaxché de Peón and there are three small haciendas: Gobonyá, Sey, and Siach. The major population areas are shown below:

Local festivals
Every year on 8 September the feast the Nativity of the Virgin Mary is celebrated.

Tourist attractions
 Archaeological site at Ucú 
 Archaeological site at Tisikul
 Hacienda Yaxché de Peón

References

Municipalities of Yucatán